Cedar Springs is a populated place situated in Navajo County, Arizona, United States.

References

External links
 Cedar Springs – ghosttowns.com

Populated places in Navajo County, Arizona
Ghost towns in Arizona